Nipah Panjang is a district in East Tanjung Jabung Regency, Jambi, Indonesia.

Localities 
 Pemusiran

Districts of Jambi